Brahmadesam may refer to several places in Tamil Nadu, India:

 Brahmadesam (Viluppuram), a village panchayat in Viluppuram taluk, Villupuram District
 Brahmadesam (Tindivanam), a village panchayat in Tindivanam Taluk, Villupuram District
 Brahmadesam (Ambasamudram), a village in Ambasamudram Taluk, Thirunelveli District
 Brahmadesam (Cheyyar), a village in Cheyyar Taluk, Tiruvannamalai district
 Brahmadesam (Bhavani), a village in Bhavani taluk, Erode district
 Brahmadesam (Veppanthai), a village in Veppanthai taluk, Perambalur district